Theo Nicolini Sander (born 8 January 2005) is a Danish professional footballer who plays as a goalkeeper for Danish Superliga club AaB.

Career

AaB
As a youth player, Sander played for a local clubs, before joining AaB in 2017 at the age of 12. Possessing a physique suited for the goalkeeping position, Sander impressed in various youth teams and attracted interest from some of Europe's major clubs. In January 2021, AaB confirmed that Sander had been on a trial with Italian giants Juventus. AaB stated that they were "in dialogue with several clubs about Theo Sander". He would, however, end up staying at AaB. In April 2021, Sander was called up for his first professional game against Vejle Boldklub. However, he remained on the bench. In the 2021–22 season, Sander was on the bench for 14 Danish Superliga games.

In February 2022 AaB confirmed, that Sander had signed a new deal until June 2025. On 28 August 2022, 17-year old Sander made his official debut for AaB against Randers FC in the Superliga. AaB lost the match 1–0 after a bad pass from Sander was intercepted by Filip Bundgaard. With his debut, Sander became the youngest goalkeeper in the Danish Superliga history.

Career statistics

References

External links

Theo Sander at DBU

2005 births
Living people
Danish men's footballers
Denmark youth international footballers
Association football goalkeepers
Danish Superliga players
AaB Fodbold players
People from Rebild Municipality
Sportspeople from the North Jutland Region